John Roos (born 19 September 1966) is a South African cricketer. He played in 26 first-class and 4 List A matches for Boland from 1990/91 to 1994/95.

See also
 List of Boland representative cricketers

References

External links
 

1966 births
Living people
South African cricketers
Boland cricketers
People from Klerksdorp